Caroline Knapp (November 8, 1959 – June 3/4, 2002) was an American writer and columnist whose candid best-selling memoir Drinking: A Love Story recounted her 20-year battle with alcoholism. She was the daughter of noted psychiatrist Peter H. Knapp, who was a researcher of psychosomatic medicine.

Life and career 
Knapp grew up in Cambridge, Massachusetts and graduated from Brown University.  From 1988–95, she was a columnist for the Boston Phoenix, where her column "Out There" often featured the fictional "Alice K."  In 1994, those columns were collected in her first book, Alice K's Guide to Life: One Woman's Quest for Survival, Sanity, and the Perfect New Shoes.

Knapp won wide acclaim for Drinking: A Love Story (1996), which described her life as a "high-functioning alcoholic" and remained on The New York Times Best Seller List for several weeks.  She followed Drinking with Pack of Two, also a best-seller, which recounted her relationship with her dog Lucille and humans' relationships with dogs in general.

In May 2002, she married her longtime friend and companion, photographer Mark Morelli.

Death
Knapp died in Cambridge of lung cancer on June 3, 2002.  Two books of hers were published after her death: Appetites: Why Women Want, which described Knapp's experience with anorexia and other women's struggles with addictions, and The Merry Recluse, a collection of essays.

Bibliography
Alice K's Guide to Life: One Woman's Quest for Survival, Sanity, and the Perfect New Shoes (1994)
Drinking: A Love Story (1996)
Pack of Two: The Intricate Bond Between People and Dogs (1998)
Appetites: Why Women Want (published posthumously, 2003)
The Merry Recluse: A Life in Essays (published posthumously, 2004)

References

External links
Providence Phoenix obituary, June 6, 2002
 New York Times obituary, June 5, 2002
 Review of Pack of Two by Susan Cheever, The New York Times, July 5, 1998
 Column 'The Merry Recluse'

1959 births
2002 deaths
American essayists
20th-century American memoirists
American self-help writers
Brown University alumni
Writers from Cambridge, Massachusetts
Deaths from lung cancer in Massachusetts
Burials at Mount Auburn Cemetery
American columnists
American women memoirists
American women essayists
American women columnists
20th-century essayists
20th-century American women
20th-century American people